Jamey Stillings (born in 1955) is an American photographer and artist known primarily for his aerial photography of renewable energy projects around the world, documenting the human impact on the environment .Stillings presents at photo festivals, universities and professional conferences globally. His work is exhibited and published widely in Asia, Australia, Europe and North and South America. His award-winning book, The Evolution of Ivanpah Solar (Steidl, 2015), documents the Ivanpah Solar Electric Generating System in the Mojave Desert of California. His photographs are in private and public collections, including the United States Library of Congress, Museum of Fine Arts - Houston, Los Angeles County Museum of Art, and Nevada Museum of Art.

Since 2010, Jamey Stillings' focus is on renewable energy through an aerial project entitled Changing Perspectives: Renewable Energy and the Shifting Human Landscape. He has photographed extensively over the United States, Japan, Uruguay and Chile from helicopters and light airplanes. His forthcoming book, Atacama: Renewable Energy and Mining in the High Desert of Chile, will be published by Steidl in 2022.

Education 
Jamey Stillings earned a BA in Art from Willamette University, magna cum laude, (1978), and an MFA in Photography from Rochester Institute of Technology (1982). His documentary master's thesis, Nicaragua: A Society in Transition (1980–81), examined social and economic changes in three rural Nicaraguan communities following the Sandinista revolution.

Major photographic projects 

 The Bridge at Hoover Dam   Stillings documented the construction of the Mike O’Callaghan—Pat Tillman Memorial Bridge, downstream from Hoover Dam, unique for its historical importance and its technical achievement. Over a two-year period, Stillings returned to document the Bridge sixteen times.  A monograph of the work, The Bridge at Hoover Dam,. was published by Nazraeli Press in 2011.
 The Evolution of Ivanpah Solar  Over a period of four years, Stillings did aerial photography documenting the construction of the Ivanpah Solar Electric Generating System in the Mojave Desert of California.  When completed in 2014, this facility was the world's largest concentrated solar thermal power plant. A monograph of the work, The Evolution of Ivanpah Solar, was published by Steidl in 2015.
 Changing Perspectives: Renewable Energy and the Shifting Human Landscape is Stillings’ long-term project. He has extensively documented renewable energy development in the American West, Japan, Uruguay and Chile.The work has been internationally exhibited, published and collected.
 Atacama:  Renewable Energy and Mining in the High Desert of Chile examines the evolving nexus between renewable energy development and mining in the Atacama Desert of Chile, part of Stillings’ larger Changing Perspectives project. In 2017, Stillings documented new renewable energy projects in the Atacama that are reducing mining's dependence on fossil fuels while supplying significant electricity to the northern grid and transmitting power to population centers in the south. ATACAMA explores utility-scale renewable energy projects including solar power, enormous mining operations, and the stark beauty of the Atacama Desert.

Publications 

 The Bridge at Hoover Dam, Nazraeli Press, 2011, ISBN 978-1590053317, essays by William L. Fox and Jamey Stillings
 The Evolution of Ivanpah Solar, Steidl, Göttingen, Germany, 2015, ISBN 978-3-86930-913-2. With foreword by Robert Redford, introduction by Anne Wilkes Tucker, essays by Bruce Barcott and Jamey Stillings

Selected editorial publications 

 The New York Times Magazine, “Bridge to Somewhere,” June 2009
 Smithsonian Magazine, “A Breathtaking New Bridge,” December 2010
 The New York Times Magazine, "A Bet on the Sun," June 17, 2012
 Newsweek Japan, "Picture Power: The Evolution of Ivanpah Solar," December 2012
 NPR, The Picture Show, "Under Construction: The World's Largest Thermal Solar Plant," January 9, 2013
 TIME Magazine, "Power Surge," October 2013
 TIME Magazine, "A Burst of Energy," March 2015
 Macleans, "Photo essay: Capturing the Sun," Canada, November 23, 2015, p. 47 (5 pgs)
 National Geographic, "A Blueprint for a Carbon-Free America," November 2015
 New Republic, "The Beauty of the World’s Largest Solar Project," December 4, 2015
 WIRED Italia, "Riflessi Solari," Italy, March 3, 2016
 National Geographic, "The Art of Solar Energy," June 2016
 Bloomberg, “Japan’s Renewable-Energy Revolution,” July 2017
 Bloomberg Businessweek, “The Renewable Desert,” August 2018
 Photoworld, “Jamey Stillings: Documenting Renewable Energy Development from the Air,” China, June 2020

Collections 
Jamey Stillings’ work is in the permanent collections of the U.S. Library of Congress; Museum of Fine Arts, Houston; Los Angeles County Museum of Art (LACMA); Nevada Museum of Art, Center for Art + Environment; UNLV University Libraries Special Collections & Archives; University of Arizona, Center for Creative Photography; Middlebury College Museum of Art; and Stanford University Libraries Special Collections & University Archives

Selected exhibitions 

 photo-eye Gallery, “The Bridge at Hoover Dam,” Premier Exhibition, Santa Fe, NM, 2009
 Etherton Gallery, “Con-struct: The New West,” three artist exhibition, Tucson, AZ, 2010
 Springs Preserve, “The Bridge at Hoover Dam,” Las Vegas, NV, 2010
 Phoenix Art Museum, “The Bridge at Hoover Dam,” Phoenix, AZ, 2011
 photo-eye Gallery, "The Bridge at Hoover Dam," Santa Fe, NM, 2011
 Blue Sky Gallery, "The Bridge at Hoover Dam," Portland, OR, 2012
 PhotoVisa, "The Bridge at Hoover Dam," Solo Exhibition, Krasnodar, Russia, 2014
 Center for Fine Art Photography, "The Evolution of Ivanpah Solar," Solo Exhibition, curated by Hamidah Glasgow Ft. Collins, CO, 2014
 Festival de la Luz, "La Evolución de Ivanpah Solar," Buenos Aires, Argentina, 2014
 Etherton Gallery, "The Evolution of Ivanpah Solar," Tucson, AZ, 2014-15
 UN Climate Change Legacy Exhibition, COP21, group exhibition, Paris, 2015
 Lianzhou Foto Festival 2015, "The Evolution of Ivanpah Solar," Solo Exhibition, Lianzhou, China
 Dishman Art Museum, Lamar University, “Jamey Stillings: The Evolution of Ivanpah Solar,” Beaumont,TX, 2016
 Mt. Rokko International Photo Festival, "The Evolution of Ivanpah Solar," Solo Exhibition, Kobe, Japan, 2016
 FotoFest 2016 Biennial, Changing Circumstances: Looking at the Future of the Planet, Featured Artist, Group Exhibition, curated by Wendy Watriss, Fred Baldwin, and Steven Evans, Houston, TX, 2016
 Pingyao International Photography Festival 2017, "Changing Perspectives: Renewable Energy and Infrastructure," Solo Exhibition, Pingyao, China
 Festival de la Luz, “Changing Perspectives: Renewable Energy and the Shifting Human Landscape,” Buenos Aires, Argentina, 2018
 Head On Photo Festival 2018, "Changing Perspectives: Renewable Energy and the Shifting Human Landscape," Solo Exhibition, Sydney, Australia

Selected awards 

 CENTER Director’s Choice Award, First Place, 2010
 International Photography Awards, 1st Place, Editorial: Environmental, Pro 2013
 Photolucida Critical Mass 2013 Solo Show Award
 TIME's Best Photobooks of 2015
 International Photographer of the Year 2016, First Place, Editorial: Environmental
 International Photography Awards 2016, Professional: Book Photographer of the Year, and Monograph, First Place
 Photo Independent's 2016 Photobook Awards, Best in Show

References

External links 
 Official website

American photographers
Living people
1955 births